Albert Nicolae Voinea (born 6 December 1992) is a Romanian footballer who plays as a forward for Concordia Chajna. In his career, Voinea also played for teams such as Pandurii Târgu Jiu, Damila Măciuca, Râmnicu Vâlcea, Ripensia Timișoara, Turris Turnu Măgurele or Mioveni among others.

Honours
CS Universitatea Craiova
Liga II: 2013–14

ACS Șirineasa
Liga III: 2017–18

References

External links
 

1992 births
Living people
People from Gorj County
Romanian footballers
Association football forwards
Liga I players
Liga II players
CS Pandurii Târgu Jiu players
ACF Gloria Bistrița players
CS Universitatea Craiova players
CS Sportul Snagov players
CS Șoimii Pâncota players
SCM Râmnicu Vâlcea players
ACS Viitorul Târgu Jiu players
CSM Deva players
CSC Dumbrăvița players
FC Ripensia Timișoara players
AFC Turris-Oltul Turnu Măgurele players
FC UTA Arad players
FC Universitatea Cluj players
CS Mioveni players
CS Concordia Chiajna players